Rivula niphodesma is a moth of the family Erebidae first described by Edward Meyrick in 1891. It is found in Australia in the Northern Territory and Queensland and Buru.

References

"Species Rivula niphodesma Meyrick, 1891". Australian Faunal Directory. Archived 9 October 2012.

Moths of Queensland
Hypeninae
Moths described in 1891
Moths of Indonesia